was a Japanese politician. He served four terms as mayor of Nagasaki from 1979 to 1995. He publicly made controversial statements about the responsibility of Japan and its then-reigning Emperor for World War II, and survived a retaliatory assassination attempt in 1990 by a right wing fanatic.

Early life and education 
Motoshima was born on February 20, 1922, in Shinkamigotō, Nagasaki. During World War II the Japanese authorities suspected Motoshima of espionage because he was a descendant of Kakure Kirishitans and born out of wedlock. When he was twenty-one he was drafted into the Imperial Japanese Army and became an artillery officer; he was stationed near Kumamoto and did not see combat before the war ended. Motoshima witnessed the aftermath of the atomic bombing of his hometown when he returned to Nagasaki about six weeks after it was bombed.

He was admitted to the Kyoto University Engineering Department, but due to World War II did not graduate until he was twenty-seven years old. Motoshima worked as a teacher before entering politics.

Political career 

Motoshima served as a Nagasaki Prefectural Legislature representative for five terms (twenty years) before being elected mayor of Nagasaki. While mayor he worked as chairman of the Liberal Democratic Party Nagasaki Prefecture Committee.

Following the mayor's controversial remarks and an attempt on his life, in the 1991 mayoral election the Communist Party did not run their own candidate and essentially supported Motoshima, who won re-election to a fourth term with additional cooperation from other progressive forces. However, facing much criticism, Motoshima lost the 1995 election to Liberal Democratic Party-endorsed opponent, Iccho Itoh, and retired from politics.

Assassination attempt 
In late 1988 during his third mayoral term, news that the Shōwa Emperor was gravely ill and not expected to live long had put Japan into a somber mood. On December 7 Motoshima was asked in a city council meeting by a council member from the Japanese Communist Party his opinion of the Emperor's responsibility for World War II. He answered:

The Liberal Democratic Party Prefectural Committee immediately demanded that he retract the statement, but Motoshima rejected the demand, saying he could not betray his conscience. In response, the Party Prefectural Committee removed him from the post of committee advisor, and many conservative organizations vilified the mayor. Furthermore, many extreme right-wing groups converged on Nagasaki and demonstrated in the streets with more than eighty speaker trucks calling out for divine retribution upon the mayor.

On January 18, 1990, when police had relaxed their guard on the mayor, a member of the right-wing group Seikijuku shot Motoshima in the back, but he survived the assassination attempt.

In 1998 Motoshima again attracted controversy by making statements such as, "It was a matter of course for atomic bombs to have been dropped on Japan, which had launched a war of aggression. Japan does not have the right to criticize the atomic bomb." for Kyodo News's interview. He is also quoted as saying, conversely, that the bombing was "one of the two great crimes against humanity in the 20th Century, along with the Holocaust."

Awards and honors
In 2002 Motoshima was awarded both the first Korea/Japan Peace and Fellowship Prize and the Order of Merit of the Federal Republic of Germany.

Death
On October 31, 2014, he died at the age of 92.

References

Further reading

External links

See also
Uyoku dantai
Japanese militarism
Sonnō jōi

1922 births
2014 deaths
Japanese anti–nuclear weapons activists
Imperial Japanese Army personnel of World War II
Japanese Roman Catholics
Republicanism in Japan
Kyoto University alumni
Liberal Democratic Party (Japan) politicians
Mayors of Nagasaki
Politicians from Nagasaki Prefecture
Officers Crosses of the Order of Merit of the Federal Republic of Germany
Shooting survivors
Imperial Japanese Army officers